Gonocarpus micranthus is a shrub in the watermilfoil family Haloragaceae native to eastern Australia and New Zealand. Common names include creeping raspwort.

References

Bibliography 

 

Flora of Queensland
Flora of Victoria (Australia)
Flora of New South Wales
micranthus
Taxa named by Carl Peter Thunberg